The montane Oldfield mouse (Thomasomys oreas) is a species of rodent in the family Cricetidae.
It is found only in Bolivia.

References

Musser, G. G. and M. D. Carleton. 2005. Superfamily Muroidea. pp. 894–1531 in Mammal Species of the World a Taxonomic and Geographic Reference. D. E. Wilson and D. M. Reeder eds. Johns Hopkins University Press, Baltimore.

Thomasomys
Mammals described in 1926
Taxonomy articles created by Polbot